SMS V27 was a  of the Imperial German Navy that served during the First World War. The ship was built by AG Vulcan at Stettin in Prussia (now Szczecin in Poland), and was completed in September 1914. The ship was sunk at the Battle of Jutland on 31 May 1916.

Construction and design
In 1913, the Imperial German Navy placed orders for 12 high-seas torpedo boats, with six each ordered from AG Vulcan (V25–V30) and Schichau-Werke (S31–S36). While the designs built by each shipyard were broadly similar, they differed from each other in detail, and were significantly larger and more capable than the small torpedo boats built for the German Navy in the last two years.

V27 was launched from AG Vulcan's Stettin shipyard on 26 March 1914 and commissioned on 2 September 1914. The "V" in V27 refers to the shipyard at which she was constructed.

Armament consisted of three 8.8 cm SK L/45 naval guns in single mounts, together with six 50 cm (19.7 in) torpedo tubes with two fixed single tubes forward and 2 twin mounts aft. Up to 24 mines could be carried. The ship had a complement of 83 officers and men.

Service
V27 was deployed in the Baltic as part of the 17th Half-flotilla in October 1914, and took part in the Battle of the Gulf of Riga in August 1915.

V27 participated in the Battle of Jutland as part of the 17th Half Flotilla of the 9th Flotilla, in support of the German battlecruisers. The 9th Flotilla, including V27, took part in a torpedo attack on British battlecruisers from about 17:26 CET (16:26 GMT). The attack was disrupted by British destroyers, and V27 was immobilised by two 4 inch shell hits, one of which severed her main steam pipe. Three of V27s crew were wounded.

References

Bibliography

 

Torpedo boats of the Imperial German Navy
1914 ships
Ships built in Stettin
World War I torpedo boats of Germany
Maritime incidents in 1916
Ships sunk at the Battle of Jutland